Alberto Jiménez Merino (born 25 September 1959) is a Mexican politician affiliated with the Institutional Revolutionary Party. He served as Deputy of the LIX Legislature of the Mexican Congress representing Puebla. A graduate of Chapingo Autonomous University, he later served as rector of the same institution from 1991 to 1995.

References

1959 births
Living people
Politicians from Puebla
Institutional Revolutionary Party politicians
21st-century Mexican politicians
Chapingo Autonomous University alumni
Heads of universities and colleges in Mexico
Deputies of the LIX Legislature of Mexico
Members of the Chamber of Deputies (Mexico) for Puebla